My Gym Children's Fitness Center is a worldwide fitness center for children between the ages of 4 months to 10 years. The company was formed in 1983 by Yacov and Susi Sherman and today has over 700 units worldwide

My Gym offers fitness classes, birthday parties, summer camps, and community events, for children ages three months to nine years old. My Gym programs include movement, tumbling, and exercise.

In fall of 2008 My Gym won a Parent’s Choice award for their DVD My Gym at Home, Fun With Monique. My Gym funds the children's entertainment group The Activators, which formed a partnership with The President's Challenge in 2011.

References

External links
 

American children's entertainers
Health clubs in the United States
Companies based in California